The 1986 Army Cadets football team was an American football team that represented the United States Military Academy in the 1986 NCAA Division I-A football season. In their fourth season under head coach Jim Young, the Cadets compiled a 6–5 record and were outscored by their opponents by a combined total of 292 to 276.  In the annual Army–Navy Game, the Cadets defeated Navy, 27–7.

Schedule

Personnel

Season summary

Syracuse

at Northwestern

Wake Forest

at Yale

at Tennessee

Holy Cross

vs Rutgers

Boston College

Air Force

Lafayette

vs Navy

The entire game was played without a single penalty being committed by either team.

References

Army
Army Black Knights football seasons
Army Cadets football